This is a list of amphibians and reptiles found on the island-nation of Saint Lucia, located in the Caribbean Lesser Antilles.

Amphibians
There are three species of amphibian on Saint Lucia, two of which were introduced.

Frogs (Anura)

Reptiles
Including marine turtles and introduced species, there are 20 reptile species reported on Saint Lucia, five of which are endemic and two extinct.

Turtles (Testudines)

Lizards and snakes (Squamata)

Notes

References
Note: All species listed above are supported by Malhotra & Thorpe 1999, unless otherwise cited.

.

 
Amphibians
Saint Lucia
 Saint Lucia
 Saint Lucia
Saint Lucia
Saint Lucia
amphibians and reptiles
Saint Lucia